William Healey was the president of Newton Heath Football Club in the 1890s and one of the club's principal creditors.

In 1897, a friendly tournament was inaugurated for clubs in the Manchester and Salford area. Healey provided a trophy for the tournament the following year, and the competition became known as the Healey Charity Cup.

Around the turn of the 20th century, Newton Heath's fortunes began to diminish, both on the pitch and in their bank balance, and they found themselves more than £2,500 in debt. Eventually, Healey took the club to court in order to claim back the £242 17s 10d that he was owed. Due to their large debts, the club was unable to repay Healey and was declared bankrupt. They were soon rescued by local businessman John Henry Davies and renamed "Manchester United". Davies took over as club chairman, thus ending Healey's association with the club.

References

English football chairmen and investors
Manchester United F.C. directors and chairmen